Maria Sharapova was the defending champion, but withdrew before her first match due to a wrist injury.

Victoria Azarenka won her first title in almost 3 years, beating Angelique Kerber in the final, 6–3, 6–1.

Seeds
The top two seeds receive a bye into the second round.

Draw

Finals

Top half

Bottom half

Qualifying

Seeds

Qualifiers

Lucky losers

Qualifying draw

First qualifier

Second qualifier

Third qualifier

Fourth qualifier

External links
 Main Draw
 Qualifying Draw

Brisbane International - Singles
Women's Singles